Viladecans is a town  near Barcelona, Spain. It is located between Sant Boi de Llobregat and Sant Climent de Llobregat, and is on the coast of the Mediterranean Sea between El Prat de Llobregat and Gavà.
Viladecans is basically a service town. It has a hospital, which serves the surrounding towns.

Viladecans has 13 or 14 schools and 30 to 40 sport teams in football, basketball, baseball, softball, gymnastics and other sports.

Demography 
This is a table of Viladecans' population demography since 1900.

Notable residents
 Enrique Cortés Pes, Olympic baseball player
 Gervasio Deferr, Olympic gymnast; has lived in Viladecans; now lives in Rubí
 María Vasco, Olympic race walker

Images

See also

 CB Viladecans

References

 Panareda Clopés, Josep Maria; Rios Calvet, Jaume; Rabella Vives, Josep Maria (1989). Guia de Catalunya, Barcelona: Caixa de Catalunya.  (Spanish).  (Catalan).

External links

 Town hall web
 Government data pages